Michael Yeboah (born 6 August 1997) is a Ghanaian professional footballer who plays as midfielder for Ghana Premier League side Medeama S.C. He previously had stints with Kumasi Asante Kotoko, Berekum Chelsea and Liberty Professionals.

Career

Early career 
Yeboah featured for lower-tier side Cornerstones F.C. before securing a move to Kumasi Asante Kotoko in 2015.

Asante Kotoko 
Yeboah signed for Ghana Premier League giants,  Kumasi Asante Kotoko in October 2015 ahead of the 2015 Ghanaian Premier League. He made his debut in the 2016 Ghanaian Premier League season, coming on in the 2–0 loss to West African Football Academy (WAFA) on 20 February 2016. On 6 March 2016, he scored his first goal in a 2–2 draw against Medeama SC.  He parted ways with Kumasi Asante Kotoko in October 2019.

Berekum Chelsea (loan) 
In January 2017, he was loaned out to Berekum Chelsea for a season long loan deal. He failed to impress on the loan deal and played a limited number of 5 league matches by the end the 2017 Ghanaian Premier League season. He returned to Kotoko at the end of the loan.

Liberty Professionals (loan) 
In January 2019, he was sent on another loan deal to Dansoman-based club Liberty Professionals along with Ibrahim Osman ahead of the 2019 Ghana Football Association Normalization Committee Special Competition.

Medeama SC 
In December 2019, Tarkwa-based side Medeama SC announced that they had secured Yeboah on a free transfer ahead of the 2019–20 Ghana Premier League. He signed a three-year deal after having a short trial at the club. He made his debut during the first match of the season as he was named on the starting line up by coach Samuel Boadu for the 3–1 victory over Cape Coast Ebusua Dwarfs on 29 December 2019. On 5 January 2020, he started and played 52 minutes of the 3–0 victory Accra Hearts of Oak.

References

External links 

Living people
1997 births
Association football midfielders
Ghanaian footballers
Asante Kotoko S.C. players
Berekum Chelsea F.C. players
Liberty Professionals F.C. players
Medeama SC players
Ghana Premier League players
Cornerstones F.C. players